St. David's School may refer to:

United Kingdom

St David's School, Middlesex
St David's School, Purley
St David's School, Middlesbrough

United States

St. David's School (Raleigh, NC)
Saint David's School (New York City)
St. David School (Richmond, California)

See also
St. David School (disambiguation)
St. David's High School (disambiguation)
St David's College (disambiguation)